Kody Afusia (born August 11, 1992) is a former American football offensive lineman. He played college football at University of Hawaii at Manoa and attended Ocean View High School in Huntington Beach, California. He has also been a member of the Los Angeles KISS, Iowa Barnstormers, and Baltimore Brigade.

Early life

College career
Afusia played for the Hawaii Rainbow Warriors from 2010 to 2014. He was the team's starter his final two years and helped the Warriors to 5 wins. He played in 37 games during his career including 16 starts at guard and 7 at center.

Professional career

Arizona Cardinals
After going undrafted in the 2015 NFL Draft, Afusia was invited to rookie mini-camp with the Arizona Cardinals.

Los Angeles KISS
On July 14, 2015, Afusia was assigned to the Los Angeles KISS of the Arena Football League. Afusia appeared in four games with the KISS in 2015, starting 3. In 2016, Afusia appeared in 8 games starting 6.

Iowa Barnstormers
Afusia signed with the Iowa Barnstormers of the Indoor Football League on October 25, 2016. On January 19, 2017, Afusia was placed on the transfer list.

Baltimore Brigade
Afusia was assigned to the Baltimore Brigade on January 12, 2017. He earned Second Team All-Arena honors in 2017.

References

External links
Hawaii Warriors profile

Living people
1992 births
Players of American football from California
American football offensive linemen
Hawaii Rainbow Warriors football players
Los Angeles Kiss players
Iowa Barnstormers players
Baltimore Brigade players
Sportspeople from Huntington Beach, California